Velebrdo is a village in the municipality of Mavrovo and Rostuša, North Macedonia. Situated on the slopes of the Dešat mountain, 2 km from the River Radika. The village has a relatively flat terrain, placed on a hill(брдо), giving it a unique position with great views of the surrounding mountains and the Radika valley.

Demographics
Velebrdo has traditionally been inhabited by Orthodox Macedonians and a Muslim Macedonian (Torbeš) population.

According to the 2002 census, the village had a total of 750 inhabitants. Ethnic groups in the village include:

Macedonians 609
Turks 132
Albanians 6
Others 3

References

Villages in Mavrovo and Rostuša Municipality
Macedonian Muslim villages